Karsten Dilla (born 17 July 1989) is a German athlete specialising in the pole vault. He represented his country at the 2011 World Championships without qualifying for the final.

His personal bests in the event are 5.72 metres outdoors (Jockgrim 2011) and 5.73 metres indoors (Bad Oeynhausen 2012).

Competition record

References

External links
Official site

1989 births
Living people
German male pole vaulters
World Athletics Championships athletes for Germany
Athletes (track and field) at the 2016 Summer Olympics
Olympic athletes of Germany
Sportspeople from Düsseldorf